Pakistan competed at the 1988 Summer Olympics in Seoul, South Korea.

Competitors
The following is the list of number of competitors in the Games.

Medalists

Athletics

Men

Track events

Field events

Boxing

Hockey

Men's team competition

Preliminary round Group A
 Defeated  (5-1)
 Defeated  (8-0)
 Defeated  (2-1)

Semifinals round
 Defeated  (1-0)

Final 5-6 places
 Defeated  (2-1)

Pakistan finished 5th

Team Roster

 Nasir Ali (captain)
 Ishtiaq Ahmed (vice-captain)
 Mansoor Ahmed (gk)
 Rizwan Munir (gk)
 Khalid Bashir
 Qazi Mohib
 Naeem Akhtar
 Naeem Amjad
 Aamer Zafar
 Tariq Sheikh
 Zahid Sharif
 Khalid Hameed
 Musaddiq Hussain
 Shahbaz Ahmed
 Qamar Ibrahim
 Tahir Zaman

Table tennis

Wrestling

Men's freestyle

Sailing

Men

References

Official Olympic Reports
International Olympic Committee results database

Nations at the 1988 Summer Olympics
1988
1988 in Pakistani sport